Herbert Edgar Wright Jr (13 September 1917 – 12 November 2015) was an American Quaternary scientist. He contributed to understanding of landscape history and environmental changes over the past 100,000 years in many parts of the world. He studied arid-region geomorphology and landscape evolution, as well as glacial geology and climate history. The study of these topics led him to the study of vegetation development and environmental history and allowed him to define the timing and mechanisms of climate-driven vegetational shifts in North America during the last 18,000 years and to recognize the role of natural fire in the dynamics of northern coniferous forests. He applied these insights to wilderness conservation and landscape management. He covered many other aspects of paleoecology including lake development and paleolimnology, and the history and development of the vast patterned peatlands of Minnesota and elsewhere in the Northern Hemisphere. Although his work was concentrated in Minnesota, he was also involved in a major synthesis of global paleoclimatology. Beyond Minnesota and the Great Lakes region, Wright studied a wide range of research questions elsewhere in North America, and in the Near East, Europe, Asia, Latin America, and Antarctica. He advised over 75 graduate students and mentored many more students, visitors, and colleagues world-wide.

Early life and education 
Wright was born on 13 September 1917 in Malden, Massachusetts. His father, Herbert Edgar Wright Sr. was an osteopath who died during the Spanish flu pandemic of 1919. His mother, Annie Mabel Richardson (1878–1964), was a nurse. Wright had an elder sister, Helena (1915–2010) who studied biology. He attended high school in Malden. He supplemented his meagre pocket money by cutting grass, selling papers, delivering and selling doughnuts made by his mother on Saturday mornings, and singing in local choirs.
Wright graduated with a BA magna cum laude from Harvard College in 1939 and received his MA and PhD in geology from Harvard University in 1941 and 1943, respectively. His PhD thesis was published in 1946. His PhD advisor and later mentor was Kirk Bryan Sr.

War service
When America entered World War II, Wright enlisted in 1942 as an air-cadet and became a Boeing B-17 Flying Fortress bomber pilot in the United States Army Air Corps. He made two tours of combat duty based in Britain and flew 48 missions in 1944–1945 including runs over Germany during D-Day, over Berlin after D-Day, and at the Battle of the Bulge. He served as a pilot, command pilot, and group operations officer, reaching the rank of major. He was awarded the Air Medal six times, the Distinguished Flying Cross twice, and the Croix de Guerre from Charles de Gaulle.

Career
After his war service, Wright was appointed in 1945 to be a teaching instructor at Brown College (now Brown University) (Providence, Rhode Island). He moved to the University of Minnesota in September 1947 as an assistant professor in the then Department of Geology (in 1962 it became the Department of Geology and Geophysics and is now the Department of Earth Sciences). He was promoted to associate professor of geology in 1951 and to professor of geology in 1959. He was also appointed professor of botany in 1965 and in ecology in 1970 within the newly-formed Department of Ecology and Evolution and Behavioral Biology (now the Department of Ecology, Evolution, and Behavior) at the University of Minnesota. He was named Regents' Professor of Geology, Ecology, and Botany in 1974 and became Regents' Professor Emeritus in 1988.

After his PhD, Wright used pollen analysis to reconstruct environmental change and landscape history. With a grant from the Hill Family Foundation (now the Northwest Area Foundation) in 1956, Wright established in 1958 a pollen laboratory in Minnesota. Wright invited experienced European pollen analysts and paleoecologists to help develop the laboratory and to advise students. With a separate grant from the Hill Family Foundation, the Limnological Research Center (LRC) was established in 1959. The pollen laboratory was incorporated within the LRC in 1963 and Wright was the LRC Director until 1990.

Wright published more than 200 international scientific papers, edited 21 books or special issues of journals, and supervised 36 PhD dissertations and 38 MSc or MA theses in the University of Minnesota's Departments of Geology, Ecology, and Botany, and its Center for Ancient Studies. He had a large teaching load, both in the lecture room and in the field, and was involved as an advisor for many graduate students and post-doctoral visitors.

Wright formally retired from his Regents’ Professorship in 1988 but continued to participate in lake-coring expeditions to remote parts of the globe, including the high Peruvian Andes, Glacier Bay in Alaska, the Azores, the Bulgarian Pirin mountains, the Caucasus of Georgia, and the Siberian Altai. Wright received the Lifetime Achievement Award from the International Paleolimnology Association in 2009 at its meeting in Guadalajara, Mexico.

Scientific research and legacy
The overarching aim of Wright's activities was to reconstruct the late-Quaternary history of individual areas and ultimately of the world and to use these reconstructions to improve our understanding of the present and the future.  He made contributions to geoarchaeology; the glacial, vegetational, and climate history of Minnesota; paleolimnology; the Cooperative Holocene Mapping Project (COHMAP); patterned peatland development; fire ecology and landscape development; and fieldcraft. Wright also invented the Wright square-rod piston corer. He has a peak named after him, Wright Peak (1510 m) 0.9 km south of Sutley Peak in the Jones Mountains, Antarctica (73° 40’ S, 94° 32’ W).

Awards and honors
 Wenner-Gren Fellow (1951, 1954–55)
 Guggenheim Fellow (1954–55)
 President of the Minnesota Chapter, Archaeological Institute of America (1956–57)
 Secretary, Geomorphological Division, Geological Society of America (1957–61)
 National Research Council Committee for International Quaternary Union (1963–69)
 DSc (Hon), Trinity College Dublin (1966)
 Chairman, Geomorphological Division, Geological Society of America (1967–70)
 President, American Quaternary Association (1971–73)
 Member of the National Academy of Sciences (1977)
 Pomerance Award, Archaeological Institute of America (1984)
 PhD (Hon), Lund University (1987)
 Archaeological Geology Division Award, Geological Society of America (1989)
 Science Achievement Award, Science Museum of Minnesota (1990)
 Distinguished Career Award, Quaternary Geology and Geomorphology Division, Geological Society of America (1992)
 Fryxell Award for Interdisciplinary Studies, Society of American Archaeology (1993)
 DSc (Hon), University of Minnesota (1996)
 Distinguished Career Award, American Quaternary Association (1996)
 Honorary President, International Quaternary Association 16th Congress (2003)
 Lifetime Achievement Award, International Paleolimnology Association (2009)

Selected books and special issues
 Wright HE and Frey DG (eds). (1965) The Quaternary of the United States. A review volume for the VII Congress of the International Association for Quaternary Research. Princeton, NJ: Princeton University Press, 922 pp.
 Cushing EJ and Wright HE (eds). (1967) Quaternary Paleoecology. Proceedings of the VII Congress of the International Association for Quaternary Research. New Haven: Yale University Press, 440 pp.
 Martin PS and Wright HE (eds). (1967) Pleistocene Extinctions. The Search for a Cause. Proceedings of the VII Congress of the International Association for Quaternary Research. New Haven: Yale University Press, 453 pp.
 Morrison RB and Wright HE (eds). (1967) Quaternary Soils. Proceedings of the VII Congress of the International Association for Quaternary Research. Desert Research Institute, University of Nevada, 338 pp.
 Osburn WH and Wright HE (eds). (1967) Arctic and Alpine Environments. Proceedings of the VII Congress of the International Association for Quaternary Research. Bloomington: Indiana University Press, 308 pp.
 Morrison RB and Wright HE (eds). (1968) Means of Correlation of Quaternary Successions. Proceedings of the VII Congress of the International Association for Quaternary Research. University of Utah Press, 631 pp.
 Wright HE (ed). (1968) Quaternary Geology and Climate. Proceedings of the VII Congress of the International Association for Quaternary Research. National Academy of Sciences, 310 pp.
 Wright HE (ed). (1980) Special Issue: Klutlan Glacier. Quaternary Research 14, 168 pp.
 Wright HE (ed). (1983) Late Quaternary Environments of the United States (2 volumes). Minneapolis: University of Minnesota Press, 407 and 277 pp.
 Velichko AA, Wright HE and Barnosky CW (eds). (1984) Late Quaternary Environments of the Soviet Union. Minneapolis: University of Minnesota Press, 327 pp.
 Ruddiman WF and Wright HE (eds). (1987) North America and Adjacent Oceans During the Last Deglaciation (The Geology of North America, Volume K-3). Geological Society of America, 501 pp.
 Wright HE, Coffin B and Aaseng NE (eds). (1992) The Patterned Peatlands of Minnesota. Minneapolis: University of Minnesota Press, 327 pp.
 Wright HE, Kutzbach JE, Webb T, Ruddiman WF, Street-Perrott FA and Bartlein PJ (eds). (1993) Global Climates Since the Last Glacial Maximum. Minneapolis: University of Minnesota Press, 569 pp.
 Berglund BE, Birks HJB, Ralska-Jasiewiczowa M and Wright HE. (eds). (1996) Palaeoecological Events During the Last 15000 Years: regional syntheses of palaeoecological studies of lakes and mires. Chichester: J. Wiley & Sons, 764 pp.
 Birks HH and Wright HE (eds). (2000) Special Issue: The Reconstruction of the Late-Glacial and Early-Holocene Aquatic Ecosystems in Kråkenes Lake, Norway. Journal of Paleolimnology 23, 115.
 Seltzer GO, Rodbell DT and Wright HE (eds). (2003) Special Issue: Late Quaternary Paleoclimates of the Southern Tropical Andes and Adjacent Regions. Palaeogeography, Palaeoclimatology, Palaeoecology 194, 338 pp.
 Ralska-Jasiewiczowa M, Latalowa M, Wasylikowa K, et al. (2004) Late Glacial and Holocene History of Vegetation in Poland Based on Isopollen Maps, Kraków: W. Szafer Institute of Botany, Polish Academy of Sciences, 444 pp.

Personal life and death
Wright met his wife-to-be Rhea Jan Hahn (1921–1988) in church choirs at Harvard University and Radcliffe College in the early 1940s and they married on 27 June 1943. Wright was then an air-cadet in the Army Air Corps and Rhea was a nursing student at Yale School of Nursing. They had six sons (Richard (1944–), Peter (1948–1955), John (1950–), Rex (1953–1988), Andy (1955–), and Jeffrey (1959–).

Wright enjoyed classical music, particularly from the Classical and Early Romantic periods (e.g. Mozart, Beethoven, Schubert, Brahms), and he regularly attended concerts of the Minnesota Orchestra, the St Paul Chamber Orchestra, and Music in the Park (now the Schubert Club).

Wright loved wilderness, often, but not always, doing scientific fieldwork such as sampling lake sediments, mapping moraines, or studying landscape patterns. After his official retirement, he took a one or two week canoe trip almost every fall to the Boundary Waters Canoe Area in northern Minnesota.

Wright died at home in Saint Anthony Park, Saint Paul on 12 November 2015 after a long illness. He is survived by his sons Dick, John, Andy, and Jeffrey along with his grandchildren Patrick, Christopher, Thierry, and Theora, and great-grandson Adrian. For the last 14 years of his life, Wright was cared for by his friend and colleague Vania Stefanova.

References

American earth scientists
1917 births
2015 deaths
People from Malden, Massachusetts
Harvard College alumni
Brown University faculty
University of Minnesota faculty
Members of the United States National Academy of Sciences
Fellows of the Ecological Society of America
Harvard Graduate School of Arts and Sciences alumni
United States Army Air Forces bomber pilots of World War II
Military personnel from Massachusetts